Ernest Stanley Wilcockson (11 May 1905 – 3 March 1965) was an English professional footballer who played as a half-back in the Football League for Crystal Palace, York City, Leeds United and Swindon Town in non-League football for Crittall Athletic, Dartford and Tunbridge Wells Rangers. After retiring he worked as a coach with West Ham United's youth team.

References

1905 births
Footballers from Poplar, London
1965 deaths
English footballers
Association football midfielders
Braintree Town F.C. players
Crystal Palace F.C. players
Dartford F.C. players
York City F.C. players
Leeds United F.C. players
Swindon Town F.C. players
Tunbridge Wells F.C. players
English Football League players
West Ham United F.C. non-playing staff